Cindy: The Doll Is Mine is a short film written and directed by French director Bertrand Bonello.

It stars Italian actress Asia Argento in the double role of photographer Cindy Sherman, a brunette, and her model, a blonde who strangely resemble one another.

The film was screened out of competition at the 2005 Cannes Film Festival.

Cast
 Asia Argento as Cindy Sherman / The model

References

External links

2005 films
French drama short films
Films directed by Bertrand Bonello
2005 drama films
2005 short films
Films with screenplays by Bertrand Bonello
2000s English-language films
2000s French films